The 1964–66 Balkans Cup was an edition of the Balkans Cup, a football competition for representative clubs from the Balkan states. It was contested by 8 teams and Rapid București won the trophy.

Group A

Group B

Finals

First leg

Second leg

Rapid București won 5–3 on aggregate.

References

External links 

 RSSSF Archive → Balkans Cup
 
 Mehmet Çelik. "Balkan Cup". Turkish Soccer

1965
1964–65 in European football
1965–66 in European football
1964–65 in Romanian football
1965–66 in Romanian football
1966–67 in Romanian football
1964–65 in Greek football
1965–66 in Greek football
1964–65 in Bulgarian football
1965–66 in Bulgarian football
1964–65 in Turkish football
1965–66 in Turkish football
1964–65 in Yugoslav football
1965–66 in Yugoslav football
1964–65 in Albanian football
1965–66 in Albanian football